Petroleum refining in the United Kingdom produced around 61 million tonnes of petroleum products in 2015, down 19% from 2011. There are six major and one minor petroleum refinery in the downstream sector of the UK oil industry.

Phillips 66, Humber Refinery, South Killingholme, 11.5 million tonnes per year
Prax, Lindsey Oil Refinery, North Killingholme, 11.0 million tonnes per year 
Petroineos, Grangemouth refinery, 10.0 million tonnes per year
Essar Energy plc., Stanlow refinery, 12.0 million tonnes per year
Valero Energy Corp., Pembroke refinery, 10.5 million tonnes per year
ExxonMobil, Fawley refinery, 16.0 million tonnes per year
 Haltermann Carless, Harwich refinery, 0.5 million tonnes per year

History 
Small-scale oil refining began in the United Kingdom in 1914. Refining capacity increased during the inter-war period. By 1938 there were 11 oil refineries in the UK.

In 1937/8 total refining oil capacity in the UK was 4.21 million tonnes per year, by 1954 this had increased to 26.64 million tonnes.

In the post-Second World War period several of the existing refineries were expanded and 3 new major oil refineries were built.

In 1964 the following refineries were operating or being constructed or planned.

By 1973 the following refineries were in operation.

In 1973, with an anticipated increase in consumption and the projected start of oil production from the UK North Sea, the following new refineries were being planned or constructed.

Following the oil crisis of 1973-4 refining capacity, and the number of oil refineries, was reduced, and many planned refineries were discontinued. In 1976 there were 17 oil refineries in the UK. By 2000 there were 12 refineries namely:

 BP Amoco, Coryton refinery (later Petroplus, closed 2012)
 Carless, Harwich refinery (now Haltermann Carless)
 Phillips 66, Humber refinery
 Total, Lindsey refinery
 Petroplus, North Tees refinery (closed 2012)
 BP Amoco, Grangemouth refinery (PetroIneos from 2004)
 Nynas, Dundee refinery (closed 2013)
 Shell/Nynas, Eastham refinery (closed after 2010)
 Shell Stanlow refinery (Essar Energy from 2011)
 Amoco, then Murco, Milford Haven refinery (closed 2015)
 Texaco, Pembroke refinery (Valero from 2011)
 Esso, Fawley refinery

Further oil company re-organisations and take-overs, and reductions in demand, led to further refinery closures. By 2019 there were 6 major and one smaller oil refineries in the UK.

Organisations

Statistics for petroleum refining in the UK are gathered by the United Kingdom Petroleum Industry Association (UKPIA), on Chancery Lane in London, and the recently formed (July 2016) Department for Business, Energy and Industrial Strategy.

The Institute of Petroleum merged with the Institute of Energy to form the Energy Institute in 2003. The modern-day institute is headquartered in Marylebone, London. Also nearby is the World Petroleum Council (WPC), known for its four-yearly World Petroleum Congresses.

See also
 :Category:Oil refineries in the United Kingdom
 Oil terminals in the United Kingdom

References

External links
 UKPIA information
 Europe (and UK) refineries at the Energy Institute

Petroleum industry in the United Kingdom